Saint-Brice-sous-Forêt is a commune in the Val-d'Oise department in Île-de-France in northern France. Sarcelles–Saint-Brice station has rail connections to Persan, Luzarches and Paris.

Population

Education
In the commune there are four preschools/nurseries, four elementary schools, and one junior high school with a total of about 1,500 students as of 2016.

Primary schools:
 Preschools/nurseries: Jean Charron, Alphonse Daudet, Charles Perrault (includes buildings A and B), and Léon Rouvrais
 Elementary schools: Pierre et Marie Curie, Jules Ferry, Jean de la Fontaine, and Antoine de Saint-Exupéry

Collège de Nézant is the junior high school in the commune. There are two senior high schools/sixth-form colleges in surrounding areas: Lycée Camille Saint-Saëns in Deuil-la-Barre and Lycée Jean-Jacques Rousseau in Montmorency.

Famous residents
 The surrealist Paul Éluard lived in Saint-Brice-sous-Forêt, and invited several future surrealists to his home including Max Ernst, André Breton and Robert Desnos.
 American author Edith Wharton lived in Saint-Brice-sous-Forêt from 1919 until her death in 1937. The road she lived on has since been named after her.

Nearby cities
The commune is bordered on the north by Piscop, which is administratively managed by Saint-Brice-sous-Forêt, on the east by Sarcelles, on the south by Groslay, and on the west by Montmorency.

See also
Communes of the Val-d'Oise department

References

External links

Association of Mayors of the Val d'Oise 

Communes of Val-d'Oise